NH 84 may refer to:

 National Highway 84 (India)
 New Hampshire Route 84, United States